Kiera Hogan (born September 16, 1994) is an American professional wrestler currently working for All Elite Wrestling (AEW). She is best known for her time in Impact Wrestling, where she is a former two-time Impact Knockouts Tag Team Champion (with Tasha Steelz). Hogan has also worked in Women Superstars Uncensored (WSU), where she is a former WSU Spirit Champion.

Professional wrestling career

Early career (2015–2018) 
Hogan began her career wrestling throughout Atlanta in 2015. She defeated Owen Knight to win the WWA4 Intergender Championship on April 16, 2015. She became a regular throughout the Georgia independent wrestling scene, competing for promotions such as Atlanta Wrestling Entertainment and the All-Star Wrestling Network. In November 2015, she began working for the Organization Of Modern Extreme Grappling Arts (OMEGA) in North Carolina. In 2016, Hogan began working throughout the United States, competing for promotions such as Booker T's Reality of Wrestling in Houston and Shine Wrestling in Florida. On February 11, 2017, she captured the WSU Spirit Championship at the WSU 10th Anniversary Show in Vorhees, New Jersey. On June 16, 2018, Hogan lost the WSU Spirit title against Jordynne Grace.

Impact Wrestling

Various storylines (2017–2020) 

On August 17, 2017, it was reported that Impact Wrestling (then known as Global Force Wrestling) had signed Hogan to a contract. On the February 1, 2018, episode of Impact!, Hogan made her Impact Wrestling debut by defeating the Knockouts Champion Laurel Van Ness in a non-title match. She received a championship match on the following episode of Impact! where she fought in a losing effort. Hogan made her pay-per-view debut at Redemption, when she unsuccessfully challenged Taya Valkyrie. Hogan received a rematch against Valkyrie on the May 3, 2018, episode of Impact!, when she won by disqualification after being attacked by Tessa Blanchard during the match. Followed that incident, Hogan faced Blanchard on the May 17 episode of Impact!, when she lost. After the match, Blanchard attacked her until Madison Rayne made the save. On the June 14 episode of Impact! Hogan unsuccessfully challenged Blanchard once again in a No Disqualification match. On October 4 episode of Impact!, Hogan lost to Su Yung. After the match, Yung and Allie brawled. Hogan saved Allie from Yung, only to be put inside a coffin by Yung. At Bound for Glory, Allie rescued Hogan from the Undead Realm.

On the May 3, 2019 edition of Impact, Hogan faced Rosemary in a grudge match stemming from a confrontation weeks prior; she was defeated via disqualification when Su Yung's undead bridesmaids entered and attacked Rosemary. Hogan began turning heel when she refused to help Rosemary against the bridesmaids, and she cemented herself as a villainess in a backstage interview on the following week, when she claimed that she wasn't getting anywhere trying to be friends with everyone, and accused Jordynne Grace of taking advantage of her. On the May 17 edition of Impact, Hogan eliminated Grace and Scarlett Bordeaux in a Knockouts Battle Royal, only to be eliminated herself by Blanchard. Following the battle royal, she began a feud with Grace, with Grace getting the upper hand on multiple occasions.

Fire 'N Flava (2020–2021) 

On the May 19, 2020 episode of Impact!, Hogan approached Impact's newest knockout Tasha Steelz and offered her to join forces with her, which Steelz agreed to. The new formed duo, now known as Fire 'N Flava, won their first match as a tag team on the June 2 episode of Impact!, where they defeated Kylie Rae and Susie. Hogan and Steelz quickly entered into a feud with Havok and Nevaeh, which led into a no disqualification match on the August 11 episode of Impact!, where Hogan and Steelz were victorious, ending their feud with Havok and Nevaeh in the process. On January 16, 2021, at Hard to Kill, Hogan and Steelz defeated Havok and Nevaeh to become the new Knockouts Tag Team Champions. At Rebellion, they lost the titles to Jordynne Grace and Rachael Ellering, ending their reign at 99 days. At Under Siege, Hogan and Steelz regained the titles from Grace and Ellering, thus becoming two-time champions. On the Slammiversary pre-show, they lost the titles to Decay (Havok and Rosemary).

On July 18, she announced her departure from the company. On the August 5 episode of Impact!, Savannah Evans attacked Hogan as Steelz only watched, thus disbanding Fire 'N Flava. The following week on Impact!, she was abducted by Su Yung and Kimber Lee, this was used to write her off television.

Women of Wrestling (2018–present) 
Hogan made her debut of Women of Wrestling (WOW) during their taping in October 2018, under the name Fire. On WOW's first episode to premier on AXS TV on January 18, 2019, Fire had her first match on WOW, where she unsuccessfully challenged Abilene Maverick. Through the second season on AXS TV, Fire teamed with Adrenaline in the tag team tournament for the vacant WOW Tag Team Championship in which they won in the second-season finale on AXS TV on May 16, which aired on tape delay on November 23.

All Elite Wrestling (2021–present) 
Hogan made her AEW debut on August 11, 2021 against Hikaru Shida on AEW: Dark Elevation where she lost. On September 6, Hogan picked up her first win for the company on AEW Dark Elevation facing Blair Onyx. On September 28, on AEW Dark Excalibur noted that Hogan had signed to the company which Hogan later revealed was true. On April 13 2022, on Dynamite Hogan became a part of The Baddies stable which includes her, Red Velvet and Jade Cargill. On the November 23, 2022 episode of Dynamite, Cargill dismissed Hogan from The Baddies.

Personal life 
On July 20, 2019, Hogan announced that she is in a relationship with fellow professional wrestler Diamante.

Championships and accomplishments 

Impact Wrestling
Impact Knockouts Tag Team Championship (2 times) – with Tasha Steelz
Impact Knockouts Tag Team Championship Tournament  (2020-21) – with Tasha Steelz
Pro Wrestling Illustrated
Ranked No. 54 of the top 100 female wrestlers in the PWI Female 100 in 2019
River City Wrestling
RCW Women's Championship (1 time, current)
 Women of Wrestling
 WOW Tag Team Championship (1 time) – with Adrenaline
 WOW Tag Team Championship Tournament (2019) – with Adrenaline
Women Superstars Uncensored
WSU Spirit Championship (1 time)
World Wrestling Alliance 4
WWA4 Intergender Champion (1 time)

References

External links 

Kiera Hogan's Impact Wrestling profile

1994 births
African-American female professional wrestlers
All Elite Wrestling personnel
American female professional wrestlers
LGBT African Americans
LGBT people from Georgia (U.S. state)
LGBT professional wrestlers
Living people
People from Decatur, Georgia
Professional wrestlers from Georgia (U.S. state)
21st-century African-American sportspeople
21st-century African-American women
Sportspeople from DeKalb County, Georgia
21st-century professional wrestlers
TNA/Impact Knockouts World Tag Team Champions